is a former Japanese football player.

Club statistics

References

External links

1981 births
Living people
Komazawa University alumni
Association football people from Fukui Prefecture
Japanese footballers
J1 League players
J2 League players
Omiya Ardija players
Expatriate footballers in Thailand
Association football midfielders